U. africana may refer to:
 Upogebia africana, a mud shrimp species
 Upupa africana, a hoopoe species

See also
 Africana (disambiguation)